Synergy is the creation of a whole that is greater than the simple sum of its parts.

Synergy may also refer to:

Aircraft
Synergy Aircraft Synergy, a US kit aircraft
Synergy Paramotors Synergy, for paragliders
Sol Synergy, a Brazilian paraglider design

Companies
Synergy University, based in Moscow
Synergy Group, a Latin American conglomerate
Synergy (electricity corporation), Western Australia
Synergy (video game company), a Japanese video game developer and publisher
Synergy Art Production, an Egyptian art production company

Entertainment 
 Synergy, an electronic music project by Larry Fast
 Synergy (Covenant album)
 Synergy (Dave Weckl Band album), 1999
 Synergy (Champ Lui-Pio album)
 Synergy (Extol album)
 Synergy (Move album)
 Synergy (Shaman's Harvest album)
 Synergy (7th Heaven album)
 Synergy (song), a song by Dance Gavin Dance
 "Synergy", a song by Haywyre
 Synergy (mod), a modification for the Valve game engine
 Synergy, a computer in the TV series Jem
 Synergy (DC Comics), a superhero

Technology
 Synergy (software), for sharing a keyboard and mouse
 Rational Synergy, a software revision control tool
 Hybrid Synergy Drive, a Toyota vehicle technology
 Synergy School Radio, UK

Other
Synergism (theology), theory of salvation
Synergy (horse)
Corporate synergy of a company acquisition
Synergy model of nursing
Obligatory synergies, spasticity
A SoBe beverage brand
Digital Keyboards Synergy, derived from the Bell Labs Digital Synthesizer
Synergy is a brand name used by ExxonMobil and Esso that identifies their fuel detergent additive technology

See also
Cinergi Pictures, a film production company
Cinergy, an energy company in Ohio
Sinergy, a Finnish heavy metal band